Willard Somers Elliot (18 July 1926 in Fort Worth, Texas – 7 June 2000 in Fort Worth, Texas) was an American bassoonist and composer. He was the bassoonist with the Houston Symphony Orchestra (1946–1949), bassoonist with the Dallas Symphony Orchestra (1951–1956), principal bassoonist with the Dallas Symphony Orchestra (1956–1964), and principal bassoonist with the Chicago Symphony Orchestra (1964–1997). Elliot composed and twice performed the Concerto for Bassoon and Orchestra with the Chicago Symphony Orchestra under conductors Seiji Ozawa and Jean Martinon.

During his 32 uninterrupted years as principal bassoonist with the Chicago Symphony, Elliot performed as a soloist under Sir Georg Solti, Seiji Ozawa, Jean Martinon, Antonio Janigro, Carlo Maria Giulini, Morton Gould, Lawrence Foster, and Claudio Abbado. He recorded the Mozart Concerto for Deutsche Grammophon, conducted by Abbado.

Elliot was also a member of the Chicago Symphony Chamber Wind Players, Chicago Symphony Winds and the Chicago Pro Musica, which won a Grammy Award in 1986 for the Best New Classical Artist.

Selected compositions
Symphony No. 2
Elegy for Bassoon and Orchestra, premiered December 7, 1959, Dallas Symphony Orchestra, Paul Kletzki conductor 
Quetzalcoatl, a tone poem
Night Piece for Small Orchestra
Concerto for Two Bassoons and Orchestra
Concerto for bassoon and orchestra (1965)
3 Duets for flute and bassoon
Six 15th-Century French Songs for oboe, bassoon, and piano (1978)
Poem for bassoon and string quartet
Quintet for bassoon and strings
Two Metamorphoses for solo bassoon, string quartet, and wind quartet
Six Portuguese Songs for bassoon and piano
Six Portuguese Folk Songs for bassoon solo and orchestra (1990)
Elegy for Orchestra (1960) (Kousevitzky award (1961)
Snake Charmer, for alto flute and orchestra (1975)
Five Impressions for Wind Octet (1981)
Fantasy, for piccolo and piano (1978)
Five short pieces for oboe and piano (1986)
Four lyric pieces for wind octet, Edvard Grieg, arranged by Willard Elliot (1986)
Ma mere l'Oye cinq pieces enfantines, Maurice Ravel, arranged for flute, oboe, clarinet, bassoon, horn, violin, viola, violoncello, and bass by Willard Elliot (1988)
March from Turandot, Carl Maria von Weber, arranged for wind octet (2 oboes, 2 clarinets, 2 horns, 2 bassoons) by Willard Elliot (1986)
Peter Schmoll ouverture, Carl Maria von Weber, arranged for wind octet by Willard Elliot (1986)
Quartet in B-flat, for bassoon, violin, viola, and violoncello, Mozart, adapted by Willard Elliot (1986)
Quejas o la maja y el ruisenor (Lament of the maja and the nightingale), from Goyescas, for wind octet: 2 oboes, 2 clarinets, 2 horns, 2 bassoons Granados, arranged Willard Elliot (1986)
Scriabiniana, suite of selected piano works, Alexander Scriabin, arranged for flute, oboe, clarinet, bassoon, horn, violin, viola, violoncello, and bass by Willard Elliot (1991)
Septet, for flute, oboe, clarinet, bassoon, horn, trumpet, and tuba, Willard Elliot (1987)
Septet, for oboe, bassoon, horn, two violins, violoncello, and bass, Glinka, new revision by Willard Elliot (1988)
Seven preludes for clarinet and piano, Alexander Scriabin, arranged by Willard Elliot (1986)
Silhouettes (from impressions), for soprano, bassoon, and piano, by Willard Elliot (1991)
Six Portuguese folk songs, for bassoon and piano, Willard Elliot (1988)
Tears, Idle Tears, for soprano, bassoon, and piano, by Willard Elliot (1990)
Two sketches, for woodwind quintet (1986)
Valse, Opus 38, for flute, clarinet, bassoon, and piano Alexander Scriabin, arranged by Willard Elliot (1986)
Evolutions, for two contra bassoons (premiered Aug 10, 1999, International Double Reed Society Annual Conference)

Most of the above compositions were published by Bruyere Music Publishers, a firm that Willard and his wife, Pat ( Patricia J. Bills), founded in 1986 to publish and popularize his compositions and arrangements.

Education
1945 – Bachelor of Music, University of North Texas
1946 – Master of Music in Composition, Eastman School of Music, University of Rochester †

† Student of Vincent Pezzi (bassoon), Sanford Sharoff (bassoon), Bernard Rogers (composition and orchestration)

Other positions
1949–1952 – Bassoon Instructor, University of North Texas College of Music
1973–1976 – Faculty, De Paul University
1979–1984 – Faculty, Northwestern University
1997–2000 – Faculty, Texas Christian University

Awards
1947 – Winner, National Federation of Music Clubs Composition Contest
1961 – Co-winner of the Koussevitsky Foundation Award, Elegy for Orchestra, performed by the Dallas Symphony Orchestra, Paul Kletzki conducting
1986 – Chicago Pro Musica received a Grammy Award for Best New Classical Artist at the 28th Grammy Awards

Selected discography
Chicago Pro Musica, The Medinah SessionsKurt Weill, Suite from The Three-Penny Opera (recorded June 1988)
Sir William Walton, Facade Suite (recorded August 1983)
Richard Strauss, Hasenöhrl, Till Eulenspiegel's Merry Pranks (recorded August 1983)
Igor Stravinsky, The Soldier's Tale – Suite (recorded August 1983)
Paul Bowles, Music for a Farce (recorded June 1988)
Bohuslav Martinů, La Revue de Cuisine (recorded June 1988)
Alexander Scriabin, Willard Elliot, Waltz in A-flat major, Opus 38 (recorded August 1983)
Carl Nielsen, Serenata in vano (recorded August 1983)
Edgard Varèse, Octandre (recorded June 1988)
Rimsky-Korsakov, Easily Blackwood, Capriccio Espagnol (recorded August 1983)

Recorded August 1983 and June 1988 at Medinah Temple, Ohio Street, Chicago (the 1983 sessions were issued two years later on a pair of discs)
The 1983 session was re-packaged with the 1988 session and re-released as an audiophile recording (analogue to HDCD) in 2001 on two CDs by the Reference Recordings

References
General referencesContemporary American Composers, A biographical dictionary, First edition, compiled by E. Ruth Anderson (1928– ), G.K. Hall & Co., Boston (1976)
William H. Rehrig, The Heritage Encyclopedia of Band Music, Composers and their music, Supplement, Integrity Press, Westerville, Ohio (1996)Composium Directory of New Music, Annual index of contemporary compositions, 1979 edition, Crystal Musicworks, Sedro Woolley, Washington (1979)Composium Directory of New Music, Annual index of contemporary compositions, 1980 edition, Crystal Musicworks, Sedro Woolley, Washington (1980)Contemporary American Composers, A biographical dictionary, Second edition, compiled by E. Ruth Anderson (1928– ), G.K. Hall & Co., Boston (1982)International Who's Who in Music and Musicians' Directory, Eighth edition, International Who's Who in Music, Cambridge, England (1977)International Who's Who in Music and Musicians' Directory, Ninth edition, edited by Adrian Gaster (1919–1989), International Who's Who in Music, Cambridge, England (1980)International Who's Who in Music and Musicians' Directory, 10th edition, International Who's Who in Music, Cambridge, England (1984)Who Was Who in America, With World notables, Volume 14, 2000-2002, Marquis Who's Who, New Providence, New Jersey (2002)Who's Who in America, 38th edition, 1974-1975, Marquis Who's Who, Wilmette, Illinois (1974)Who's Who in America, 39th edition, 1976-1977, Marquis Who's Who, Wilmette, Illinois (1976)Who's Who in America, 40th edition, 1978-1979, Marquis Who's Who, Wilmette, Illinois (1978)Who's Who in America, 41st edition, 1980-1981, Marquis Who's Who, Wilmette, Illinois (1980)Who's Who in America, 42nd edition, 1982-1983, Marquis Who's Who, Wilmette, Illinois (1982)Who's Who in America, 47th edition, 1992-1993, Marquis Who's Who, New Providence, New Jersey (1992)Who's Who in America, 48th edition, 1994, Marquis Who's Who, New Providence, New Jersey (1993)Who's Who in America, 49th edition, 1995, Marquis Who's Who, New Providence, New Jersey (1994)Who's Who in America, 50th edition, 1996, Marquis Who's Who, New Providence, New Jersey (1995)Who's Who in America, 51st edition, 1997, Marquis Who's Who, New Providence, New Jersey (1996)Who's Who in America, 52nd edition, 1998, Marquis Who's Who, New Providence, New Jersey (1997)Who's Who in America, 53rd edition, 1999, Marquis Who's Who, New Providence, New Jersey (1998)Who's Who in America, 54th edition, 2000, Marquis Who's Who, New Providence, New Jersey (1999)Who's Who in America, 55th edition, 2001, Marquis Who's Who, New Providence, New Jersey (2000)Who's Who in American Music: Classical, R.R. Bowker, New York (1983)Who's Who in Entertainment, Second edition, 1992-1993, Marquis Who's Who, Wilmette, Illinois (1992)Who's Who in Entertainment, Third edition, 1998- 1999, Marquis Who's Who, New Providence, New Jersey (1997)Who's Who in the Midwest, 15th edition, 1976-1977, Marquis Who's Who, Wilmette, Illinois (1976)Who's Who in the Midwest, 16th edition, 1978-1979,'' Marquis Who's Who, Wilmette, Illinois (1978)

Inline citations

1926 births
2000 deaths
American male composers
American classical bassoonists
University of North Texas College of Music alumni
Eastman School of Music alumni
University of North Texas College of Music faculty
Texas classical music
20th-century classical musicians
20th-century American composers
20th-century American male musicians